Bokermannohyla lucianae is a species of frogs in the family Hylidae.

It is endemic to Una, Bahia, Brazil.

Its natural habitats are subtropical or tropical moist lowland forests, rivers, and intermittent freshwater marshes. Threats are unknown but it is known from protected areas Reserva Particular do Patrimônio Natural Ecoparque de Una and Reserva Particular do Patrimônio Natural Ecoparque de Una.

Sources

Bokermannohyla
Endemic fauna of Brazil
Frogs of South America
Amphibians described in 2003
Taxonomy articles created by Polbot